The Ministry of Municipal Affairs and Housing (French: Ministère des Affaires municipales et de l'Habitation) is a government ministry in the Canadian province of Quebec. It is responsible for overseeing the provincial government's relations with all Quebec municipalities, regional governments, the metropolitan communities of Montreal and Quebec City, and the regional administration of Kativik.

The ministry is overseen by a member of the cabinet of Quebec. The current minister is Andrée Laforest.

The ministry is commissioned to work with the Société d'habitation du Québec on issues related to housing.

References

External links
Official website
Répertoire des municipalités (information lookup)

Municipal Affairs, Regions